Tinatamarre is a word in Acadian French meaning "clangour" or "din", and may refer to:

Tintamarre, an Acadian noisemaking tradition
Tantramar Marshes, a National Wildlife Area in New Brunswick, Canada, named after the noisy flocks of birds which feed in the marshes
Île Tintamarre, an uninhabited island administered by the French overseas collectivity Saint Martin
A former name for areas of Middle and Upper Sackville, New Brunswick
Tintamarre theatre company, a student theatre troupe at Mount Allison University in Sackville, New Brunswick